Sudhir Bhaskarrao Tambe Patil is an Indian politician and a former member of the Maharashtra Legislative Council from the Nashik Graduate constituency in Maharashtra, India. He is the Chief trustee of Amrutvahini rural charitable hospital, Sangamner. He contested and won the Maharashtra Legislative Council elections from Nashik Graduate constituency in 2009, 2011 and 2017. His son Satyajeet Tambe won from same constituency in 2022 elections..

Education 
Sudhir Bhaskarrao Tambe is General Surgeon and Completed his Master of Surgeon from B. J. Medical College Pune.

Career 
Sudhir Tambe had represented Nashik Graduate constituency for 3 terms. He won in 2009, 2011 and 2017.

References

Indian National Congress politicians from Maharashtra
Nashik municipal councillors
1955 births
Living people
Members of the Maharashtra Legislative Council